Coelestina (minor planet designation: 237 Coelestina) is a typical Main belt asteroid.

It was discovered by Johann Palisa on 27 June 1884 in Vienna and was named after Coelestine, wife of astronomer Theodor von Oppolzer.

References 

The Asteroid Orbital Elements Database

External links
 
 

Background asteroids
Coelestina
Coelestina
S-type asteroids (Tholen)
S-type asteroids (SMASS)
18840627